Huskins is a surname. Notable people with the surname include:

Kent Huskins (born 1979), Canadian hockey player
Jeff Huskins, American country musician
Charles Leonard Huskins (1897–1953), English-Canadian geneticist
J. Frank Huskins (1911–1995), associate justice
 Rachel Huskins (2000-current), domestic violence activist and social media personality

See also
Haskins (surname)